Benjamin Dilley (born September 18, 1991 in Lincoln, Nebraska) is an American former professional cyclist, who competed for  between 2014 and 2016. He was diagnosed with diabetes at the age of 14. 

Dilley now works as a Strength and Conditioning Associate at Purdue University.

References

External links

1991 births
Living people
American male cyclists
Sportspeople from Lincoln, Nebraska
Cyclists from Nebraska